"Dressed to Kill" is the fourteenth episode of the third series of the 1960s cult British spy-fi television series The Avengers, starring Patrick Macnee and Honor Blackman. It originally aired on ABC on 28 December 1963. The episode was directed by Bill Bain and written by Brian Clemens.

Plot
A false alarm triggers all but one of the nation's nuclear attack early warning systems. Steed and Cathy go undercover to investigate and are invited to a fancy dress party on a train. As guests die one by one, it becomes apparent that one is their killer. The plot was reused in a later episode, The Superlative Seven.

Cast
 Patrick Macnee as John Steed
 Honor Blackman as Cathy Gale
 Leonard Rossiter as Robin Hood, William J. Cavendish 
 Alexander Davion as Napoleon, Frederick Preston 
 Richard Leech as Policeman, Jack Roberts 
 John Junkin as Sheriff, Kenneth Johnson 
 Anneke Wills as Pussy Cat, Jane Wentworth 
 Anthea Windham as Highwaywoman, Dorothy Wilson 
 Leon Eagles as Newman 
 Frank Maher as Barman

References

External links

Episode overview on The Avengers Forever! website

The Avengers (season 3) episodes
1963 British television episodes